Ibrahim Diallo (born 23 January 1998) is a French rugby union player. His position is in the back row and he currently plays for Racing 92 in the Top 14.

Honours

International 
 France (U20)
World Rugby Under 20 Championship winners: 2018

References

External links
France profile at FFR
Racing 92 profile
L'Équipe profile

1998 births
Living people
People from Sarcelles
French rugby union players
Racing 92 players
Rugby union flankers
Black French sportspeople
France international rugby union players
Sportspeople from Val-d'Oise